The Campeonato Nacional de Rugby II Divisão is the third tier of the Portuguese Rugby League. It consists in regional groups (2 groups in 2015-16: North (8 clubs) and South (8 clubs)).

Season 2015-16 teams

Group North
 Bairrada
 Guimarães RUFC
 Famalicão
 Braga Rugby
 Aveiro
 NR Lousã
 Agrária
 Prazer Jogar Rugby

Group South
 Belas
 Ubuntu
 AEFC Tecnologia
 Borba
 Loulé
 Vilamoura AC
 Força 15
 Dark Horses

Champions

See also
 Rugby union in Portugal

References

External links
 Portuguese Rugby Federation Official Website

Rugby union leagues in Portugal